Alīna Šilova (born 28 April 1996) is a Latvian footballer who plays as a midfielder for Sieviešu Futbola Līga club FS Metta. She has been a member of the Latvia women's national team.

References

1996 births
Living people
Latvian women's footballers
Women's association football midfielders
FK Liepājas Metalurgs (women) players
Latvia women's youth international footballers
Latvia women's international footballers